Dowlatabad Rural District may refer to:
 Dowlatabad Rural District (Namin County), Ardabil province
 Dowlatabad Rural District (Marand County), East Azerbaijan province
 Dowlatabad Rural District (Kerman Province)
 Dowlatabad Rural District (Kermanshah Province)
 Dowlatabad Rural District (Abhar County), Zanjan province